M. Moleiro Editor is a publishing house specialising in high-quality facsimile reproductions of codices, maps and illuminated manuscripts. Founded in Barcelona in 1991, the firm has reproduced many masterpieces from the history of illumination.

Background 
In 1976, whilst still a student, Manuel Moleiro created Ebrisa, a publishing house specialised in books on art, science and cartography which collaborated on a variety of joint enterprises with other publishers including Times Books, Encyclopædia Britannica, Macmillan, Edita, Imprimerie Nationale and Franco Maria Ricci.

In 1991, Moleiro decided to create a company with his own name and brand. Since then he has specialised in identical reproductions of some of the greatest medieval and Renaissance bibliographic treasures, obtaining authorisation to do so from libraries and museums of great universal renown such as the Bibliothèque nationale de France, the British Library, the Morgan Library & Museum, the Metropolitan Museum, New York, the National Library of Russia, the Huntington Library and the Gulbenkian Foundation, Lisbon.

To certify this labour of cultural diffusion, each facsimile has a companion volume of studies by manuscript experts.

Publishing activities 
As a result of publishers applying the term “facsimile” to different types of reproduction of poor quality in recent decades, M. Moleiro Editor decided to label their codices “quasi-original” to reflect the accuracy of their reproductions. In 2010, the French newspaper Le Monde wrote, "The Spanish publishing house Moleiro has invented the “quasi original”, a more appropriate term for describing the extremely painstaking artisan work involved in manufacturing these works which are more like clones than facsimiles". Indeed, no expense is spared in any of their editions to duplicate the texture, smell, thickness and variable density of paper and parchment, the gold in the miniatures, the leather bindings, and thread used to sew them. The resulting copies are therefore deemed to be clones and not merely reproductions.

All this publisher's editions are unique, first editions, limited to 987 numbered copies authenticated by notary public.

In 2001, The Times described the work of this publishing house as “The Art of Perfection”.  One year later in the same newspaper, Allegra Stratton wrote that "the Pope sleeps with one of Moleiro's quasi-originals by his bed".

Landmark works reproduced by M. Moleiro Editor 
M. Moleiro Editor has reproduced several works by Beatus of Liébana – the Cardeña Beatus, the Arroyo Beatus, the Silos Beatus,  the Beatus of Ferdinand I and Sancha and the Girona Beatus – and also the three volumes of the Bible of Saint Louis, deemed to be the most important bibliographic monument of all time with a total of 4887 miniatures. Their catalogue also features many books of hours such as the Isabella Breviary, the Great Hours of Anne of Brittany and the Book of Hours of Joanna I of Castile; medicinal treatises such as the Book of Simple Medicines and Tacuinum Sanitatis and cartographic masterpieces such as the Miller Atlas and the Vallard Atlas.

Complete list of “quasi-original” editions 
Beatus of Liébana, Codex of Ferdinand I and Sancha of Castille and León
Beatus of Liébana, Gerona Codex
Beatus of Liébana, Monastery of San Andrés de Arroyo
Beatus of Liébana, Monastery of San Pedro de Cardeña
Beatus of Liébana, Monastery of Santo Domingo de Silos
Bible moralisée of Naples
Bible of Saint Louis
Book of Felicity
Book of Hours of Charles VIII
Book of Hours of Louis of Orleans
Book of Hours of Maria of Navarre
Book of Simple Medicines
Book of Testaments
Book of Treasures
Catalan Mappa Mundi
Christopher Columbus’s Chart
Genealogy of Christ
Grandes heures of Anne of Brittany
Heures de Charles d'Angoulême
Great Canterbury Psalter
Hours of Henry VIII
 Hours of Henry IV of France
 Hours of Charles of Angoulême
 Hours of Jean de Montauban
Isabella Breviary
Martyrology of Usuard
Miller Atlas
Prayer Book of Albert of Brandenburg
Romance of the Knight Zifar
Splendor Solis
Tacuinum Sanitatis
The Apocalypse of 1313
The Flemish Apocalypse
The Golf Book (Book of Hours)
The Gulbenkian Apocalypse
The Book of Hours of Joanna I of Castile, Joanna the Mad
Theatrum Sanitatis
Theriaka and Alexipharmaka
Tractatus de Herbis
Universal Atlas of Diogo Homem
Universal Atlas of Fernao Vaz Dourado
Vallard Atlas

References

External links 
Moleiro.com: M. Moleiro Editor website
 Moleiro.com: The Times article (April 23, 2001)
 Le Monde article (September 30, 2010)
 Moleiro.com: Le Monde article (November 19, 2011)
 Lefigaro.fr: Le Figaro magazine article (January 13, 2011)
 Moleiro.com: Frankfurter Allgemeine Zeitung article (January 2, 2011)

Book publishing companies of Spain
Illuminated manuscripts
Mass media in Barcelona
Companies based in Barcelona
Publishing companies established in 1991
Spanish companies established in 1991